Lytton Smith (born 1982) is an Anglo-American poet. His most recent poetry collection is The All-Purpose Magical Tent (Nightboat Books, 2009), which was selected by Terrance Hayes for the Nightboat Books Poetry Prize in 2009, and was praised by Publishers Weekly in a starred review as "...fantastic and earthy, strange and inherited, classical and idiosyncratic, at once." He also has a previous chapbook, Monster Theory, selected by Kevin Young for the Poetry Society of America Chapbook Fellowship in 2008. Smith's poetry has appeared in a number of prominent literary journals and magazines such as The Atlantic, Bateau, Boston Review, Colorado Review, Denver Quarterly, Tin House, and many others. Lytton Smith was born in Galleywood, England. He moved to New York City, where he became a founder of Blind Tiger Poetry, an organization dedicated to promoting contemporary poetry. He has taught at Columbia University, Plymouth University in the southwest of England, and now teaches at the State University of New York at Geneseo. He has also translated a number of books by Icelandic writers, including Jón Gnarr, Kristín Ómarsdóttir, Bragi Ólafsson, and Guðbergur Bergsson.

Honors and awards
 2009 Nightboat Poetry Prize
 2008 Poetry Society of America Chapbook Fellowship

Bibliography
Full-Length Poetry Collections

 The All-Purpose Magical Tent (Nightboat Books, 2009)

Chapbooks
 Monster Theory (Poetry Society of America, 2008)

References

External links
Lytton Smith's Blog
Audio: Lytton Smith Reading for From the Fishouse
Author Page: Book listing on Nightboat Books' Distributor's Website
Author Page: Amazon Book Listing
 Interview: Kicking Wind > Every Other Day > May 2007 > Interview with Lytton Smith

1982 births
Living people
21st-century American poets
English-language poets
Poets from New York (state)
English emigrants to the United States
Columbia University faculty
Academics of the University of Plymouth
Chapbook writers
American male poets
English male poets
21st-century American male writers